Christoph Greger (born 14 January 1997) is a German footballer who plays as a defender for Viktoria Köln.

References

External links
 

1997 births
Living people
Footballers from Munich
German footballers
Association football defenders
SpVgg Unterhaching players
FC Viktoria Köln players
Regionalliga players
3. Liga players